The 2003 African Junior Athletics Championships was the sixth edition of the biennial, continental athletics tournament for African athletes aged 19 years or younger. It was held in Garoua, Cameroon, from 31 July to 3 August. A total of 44 events were contested, 22 by men and 22 by women.

Medal summary

Men

Women

References

Results
African Junior Championships 2003. World Junior Athletics History. Retrieved on 2013-10-13.

African Junior Athletics Championships
African Junior Championships
International athletics competitions hosted by Cameroon
2003 in Cameroonian sport
African Junior Athletics
Garoua
2003 in youth sport